Shi Meiping (born 28 October 1964) is a Chinese rower. She competed in the women's coxed four event at the 1984 Summer Olympics.

References

1964 births
Living people
Chinese female rowers
Olympic rowers of China
Rowers at the 1984 Summer Olympics
Place of birth missing (living people)